Vera Lapko was the defending champion, but was no longer eligible to participate. Lapko competed in the women's singles qualifying but lost in the second round to Ons Jabeur.

Ukrainian Marta Kostyuk won the title, defeating Rebeka Masarova in the final, 7–5, 1–6, 6–4.

Seeds

Draw

Finals

Top half

Section 1

Section 2

Bottom half

Section 3

Section 4

Qualifying

Seeds

Qualifiers

Draw

First qualifier

Second qualifier

Third qualifier

Fourth qualifier

Fifth qualifier

Sixth qualifier

Seventh qualifier

Eighth qualifier

External links 
 Main draw  at ausopen.com
 Draw at itftennis.com

Girls' Singles
Australian Open, 2017 Girls' Singles